Hiram Smith may refer to:

 Hiram F. Smith (1829–1893), American settler in the Pacific Northwest
 Hiram N. Smith (1817–1890) American politician from Wisconsin
 Hiram T. Smith (died 1838), casualty of the bloodless Maine Aroostook War
 Hiram Y. Smith (1843–1894), American politician from Iowa

See also
 Hyrum Smith (disambiguation)